The Last of His Tribe is a 1992 American made-for-television drama film based on the book Ishi in Two Worlds by Theodora Kroeber which relates the experiences of her husband Alfred L. Kroeber who made friends with Ishi, thought to be the last of his people, the Yahi tribe. Jon Voight stars as Kroeber and Graham Greene as Ishi. Harry Hook directed the film.

Plot
The movie is based on the real experiences of a Native American, Ishi, as he tries to adjust to a 20th-century society that is foreign to him.

Cast
Jon Voight as Professor Alfred Kroeber
Graham Greene as Ishi
David Ogden Stiers as Dr. Saxton Pope
Jack Blessing as Tom Waterman
Anne Archer as Henriette Kroeber
Daniel Benzali as Mr. Whitney

Production

The railroad scenes were filmed on the Sierra Railroad in Tuolumne County, California.

Reception
For his performance, Jon Voight was nominated for the 1992 Golden Globe Award for Best Actor – Miniseries or Television Film.

See also
Ishi: The Last of His Tribe

References

External links

1992 television films
1992 films
1992 drama films
American drama television films
Films about Native Americans
Films directed by Harry Hook
HBO Films films
1990s English-language films
1990s American films